

Alexander Edler von Daniels (17 March 1891 – 6 January 1960) was a German general in the Wehrmacht during World War II who fought in the Battle of Stalingrad.

Daniels commanded the 376th Infantry Division at Stalingrad, which was part of XI Corps of the German Sixth Army. In late December 1942, after Operation Uranus encircled the Sixth Army, Daniels was promoted to Generalleutnant and awarded the Knight's Cross of the Iron Cross. Daniels surrendered himself and his division to Col. Ivan Konstantinovich Morozov, commander of the 422nd Rifle Division, and was marched into captivity by the Red Army on 29 January 1943, where he was interrogated by Captain Nikolay Dyatlenko.

Awards and decorations

 Knight's Cross of the Iron Cross on 18 December 1942 as Generalmajor and commander of 376. Infanterie-Division

References

Citations

Bibliography

 
 

1891 births
1960 deaths
Military personnel from Trier
People from the Rhine Province
German Army personnel of World War I
Reichswehr personnel
Lieutenant generals of the German Army (Wehrmacht)
German commanders at the Battle of Stalingrad
Edlers of Germany
Recipients of the clasp to the Iron Cross, 1st class
Recipients of the Gold German Cross
Recipients of the Knight's Cross of the Iron Cross
German prisoners of war in World War II held by the Soviet Union
Prussian Army personnel
20th-century Freikorps personnel
German nobility